The American Car Company was a streetcar manufacturing company based in St. Louis, Missouri, United States. It was one of the country's leading streetcar builders during the heyday of streetcar operation. The company was founded in 1891 by William Sutton and Emil Alexander, who had previously founded the Laclede Car Company in 1883 also in St. Louis, and had both got their start working in the streetcar business at St. Louis' horsecar manufacturer, the Brownell Car Company.

The American Car Company was a builder of electric powered streetcars. ACC was bought out by the J. G. Brill Company of Philadelphia in 1902. However, Brill continued to operate the American Car Co. under its own name until 1931, when it was reorganized as J. G. Brill of Missouri.

In 1915, American Car built the very first Birney-type trolley, the prototype of a new design then known as the "Safety Car", and went on to build more Birney cars than any other manufacturer. The Fort Collins Municipal Railway, in Colorado, and the Fort Smith Trolley Museum, in Arkansas, are examples of operations where preserved Birney cars built by the American Car Company can still be seen running today.  

In 1931, only four months after parent company J. G. Brill discontinued use of the American Car Company name, the ex-ACC factory in St. Louis closed permanently.

See also
 Birney Safety Streetcar No. 224
 American Car and Foundry Company
 List of tram builders

References

External links
 American Car Company history, by the Mid-Continent Railway Museum

Manufacturing companies based in St. Louis
Defunct rolling stock manufacturers of the United States
Electric vehicle manufacturers of the United States
J. G. Brill Company